Harold Garwood Nicholls (19 November 1897 – 10 August 1977) was a New Zealand rugby football player who represented New Zealand in rugby union. Two of his brothers, Mark and Harry, also represented the All Blacks.

Playing career
Nicholls played for the Petone Rugby Club and was the eldest of three brothers.

He first played for Wellington in 1915 before serving in the military for the rest of World War I. In 1919 he again played rugby union for Wellington before switching codes to rugby league. In rugby league Nicholls also represented Wellington for two seasons.

Nicholls was allowed to switch again in 1922 and played rugby union for Wellington in 1922 and 1923. In 1923 he was selected for the All Blacks against the touring New South Wales side and played in one match.

References

New Zealand rugby league players
Wellington rugby league team players
1897 births
1977 deaths
New Zealand rugby union players
New Zealand international rugby union players
Wellington rugby union players
Rugby union players from Wellington City
Rugby league centres
New Zealand military personnel of World War I